Great Eagle was an American automobile manufacturer, in business from from 1910 to 1915. It was located in Columbus, Ohio, and the president was Fred C. Myers. Great Eagle was also the brand of the cars, which were mostly large cars. The company went into receivership in 1915.

Models

References

Defunct motor vehicle manufacturers of the United States
Motor vehicle manufacturers based in Ohio
Companies based in the Columbus, Ohio metropolitan area